Squatirhina is a genus of Late Cretaceous cartilaginous fish whose fossils have been found in the Aguja and Pen Formations of Big Bend National Park, Texas, USA.

See also

 List of prehistoric cartilaginous fish

Footnotes

References
 Hunt, ReBecca K., Vincent L. Santucci and Jason Kenworthy. 2006. "A preliminary inventory of fossil fish from National Park Service units." in S.G. Lucas, J.A. Spielmann, P.M. Hester, J.P. Kenworthy, and V.L. Santucci (ed.s), Fossils from Federal Lands. New Mexico Museum of Natural History and Science Bulletin 34, pp. 63–69.

Prehistoric cartilaginous fish genera
Cretaceous cartilaginous fish
Late Cretaceous fish of North America
Laramie Formation
Ojo Alamo Formation